Lucas Daniel Silva Barbosa (born February 13, 1992), commonly known as Lucas 'Hulk' Barbosa, is a Brazilian mixed martial artist (MMA), submission grappler and Brazilian jiu-jitsu (BJJ) black belt competitor.

Having conquered nearly every major title in the sport; being a World and Pan American champion (Gi and No-Gi), European Open and Asian IBJJF champion as well as a two-time ADCC Submission Fighting World Championship medalist,  Barbosa is regarded as one of the most accomplished jiu-jitsu athletes of his generation.

Background
Lucas Daniel Barbosa was born on February 13, 1992, in Boa Vista, Roraima, Brazil. He took up martial arts at the age of 10, starting with Taekwondo then Judo and Muay Thai. At 15 Barbosa began Brazilian jiu-jitsu (BJJ) under various coaches from Diego Lopes to Cristiano Carioca and André Galvão. After being promoted to purple belt, Barbosa moved to Rio to train at Márcio Rodrigues's academy, receiving the nickname "Hulk" from his training partners.

Grappling career
Barbosa was awarded his Brown Belt in BJJ by Fabiano and Márcio Rodrigues. It was at Brown Belt that Barbosa's grappling career took off. In 2014, he was involved with "THE TEAM" in 2014, a web series developed by Copa Podio, a sports league that showed BJJ competitions on television. Barbosa's strong performance earned him a spot later that year at the competition's main which was on Pay-per-view.

In 2015, Barbosa won the World IBJJF Jiu-Jitsu Championship and Abu Dhabi World Professional Jiu-Jitsu Championship as a Brown Belt. As a result, Fabiano awarded Barbosa his Black Belt in BJJ.

Shortly afterwards, Barbosa moved to San Diego, California, to join Atos Jiu-Jitsu under André Galvão. Since moving to Atos Jiu-Jitsu, Barbosa has won most major BJJ tournaments at Black Belt level including the World Championship and the World No-GI Championship. He also is a multiple-time medalist at the ADCC World Championship.

2020
Barbosa was invited to compete in the Third Coast Grappling grand prix 6 on September 12, 2020. He withdrew from the event due to undisclosed reasons. He was matched at the promotion's next event instead, in a superfight against Guilherme Augusto. Barbosa won a unanimous decision against Augusto at the event on September 26, 2020.

Barbosa represented ATOS in a team-grappling event at Subversiv 4 on October 31, 2020. He led his team to victory in the tournament, defeating all four of his opponents on the night.

2021
Barbosa was invited to compete in a heavyweight grand prix at BJJ Stars 5 on February 6, 2021. He defeated Yuri Simões on points in the first round but lost a decision to Gutemberg Pereira in the semi-final. Barbosa then led ATOS once again at Subversiv 5 on May 1, 2021. Barbosa once again won all of his matches and ATOS won the tournament for the second time.

Barbosa competed in the main event of Fight 2 Win 174 against Aaron 'Tex' Johnson on June 18, 2021, and lost a decision. On June 26, 2021, he defeat Matheus Diniz on points at BJJ Stars 6. He was then invited to compete in the first Road to ADCC event on July 17, 2021, against William Tackett. Barbosa managed to score thirty-four points against Tackett during their match and won by a wide margin.

Barbosa then competed in a no gi grand prix at BJJ Bet 2 on August 1, 2021, and defeated all three of his opponents to win the tournament. He was then invited to compete in the main event of BJJ Stars 7 against UFC veteran Gilbert Burns on November 6, 2021, and he submitted Burns with a rear-naked choke. Barbosa competed in the inaugural Raw Grappling Championship event on November 12, 2021, in a superfight against Gerard Labinski, submitting him with an armbar.

2022

Barbosa competed in a middleweight grand prix at BJJ Stars 8 on February 15, 2022, and defeated his first two opponents before losing to Micael Galvão in the final. He was then invited to compete in the 2022 ADCC World Championship as a result of winning a medal at the event in 2019. He defeated Santeri Lilius, Josh Hinger, and Vagner Rocha before losing to Giancarlo Bodoni in the final and earning a silver medal.

Mixed martial arts career

Barbosa made his debut in 2011 where he lost a split decision against Geydson Cardoso.

In 2012, Barbosa faced Tiago Sena twice, winning by Submission and then TKO.

In 2020, Barbosa stated in an interview that he planned to return to MMA due to financial incentives as well as seeking more challenges. He reiterated this in 2021, announcing his intention to return by the end of the year.

In February 2022, it was announced that Barbosa was scheduled to fight Troy Green at the PFL Challenger Series 2. However Green withdrew from the fight and no replacement was found.

In August 2022, it was announced that Barbosa was scheduled to fight Elmar Umarov at PFL 7. However Umarov withdrew due to illness.

Barbosa faced Itso Babulaidze at PFL Challenger Series 9 on 27 January, 2023. After a strong start, Barbosa faded as the bout went and he lost the bout via unanimous decision.

Championships and accomplishments

Brazilian jiu-jitsu / Submission wrestling 
List of achievements at black belt level:
 World IBJJF Jiu-Jitsu Champion (2018)
 4 x World IBJJF No-Gi champion (2017, 2016, 2015)
 2 x Pan-American IBJJF Champion (2019, 2018)
 Pan-American IBJJF No-Gi Champion (2021, 2020)
 European Open IBJJF Champion (2018)
 2 x Asian IBJJF Champion (2018, 2017)
 UAEJJF Grand Slam Champion, Los Angeles (2017)
 UAEJJF Grand Slam Champion, Abu Dhabi (2019)
 American Nationals IBJJF Champion (2017)
 American Nationals IBJJF No-Gi Champion (2017,  2016)
 FIVE Super League LHW Champion (2017)
 Chicago Summer Open IBJJF Champion (2016)
 Chicago Summer Open IBJJF No-Gi Champion (2016)
 Dallas Fall Open IBJJF Champion (2017)
 2nd place ADCC Submission Fighting World Championship (2022)
 2nd place World IBJJF Championship (2021)
 2nd place European Open IBJJF No-Gi Champion (2018)
 2nd place Pan IBJJF Championship (2017)
 2nd place Pan IBJJF No-Gi Championship (2021, 2020)
 3rd place ADCC Submission Fighting World Championship (2019)
 3rd place European Open IBJJF (2018)

List of achievements in lower belts divisions:
 World IBJJF Jiu-Jitsu Champion (2015 brown)
 UAEJJF Abu Dhabi World Pro Champion (2015 brown)
 South American IBJJF Champion (2014 brown)
 CBJJ Brazilian Nationals Champion (2014 brown)
 Rio Fall Open IBJJF Champion (2015 brown)
 Rio Fall Open IBJJF No-Gi Champion (2015 brown)

Mixed martial arts record

|-
| Loss
| align=center| 2–2
|Itso Babulaidze	
|Decision (unanimous)
|PFL Challenger Series 9
|
|align=center| 3
|align=center| 5:00
|Orlando, Florida, United States
| 
|-
|  Win
| align=center| 2–1
| Tiago Sena
| TKO (punches)
| Roraima Show Fight 10
| 
| align=center| 1
| align=center| 3:50
| Boa Vista, Brazil
| 
|-
|  Win
| align=center| 1–1
| Tiago Sena
| Submission (Rear-Naked Choke)
| Roraima Show Fight 9
| 
| align=center| 2
| align=center| 0:00
| Boa Vista, Brazil
| 
|-
| Loss
| align=center| 0–1
| Geydson Manfrinny Cardoso
| Decision (split)
| Boa Vista Combat 2
| 
| align=center|3
| align=center|5:00
| Boa Vista, Brazil
|  
|-

Instructor lineage 
Mitsuyo "Count Koma" Maeda → Carlos Gracie → Reyson Gracie →  Osvaldo Alves → Pascoal Duarte →  Diego Lopes → André Fabiano → Lucas Barbosa

Notes

References

External links

 
 

1992 births
Living people
Brazilian male mixed martial artists
Mixed martial artists utilizing Brazilian jiu-jitsu
Brazilian jiu-jitsu practitioners who have competed in MMA (men)
Brazilian practitioners of Brazilian jiu-jitsu
People awarded a black belt in Brazilian jiu-jitsu
Sportspeople from Roraima
World Brazilian Jiu-Jitsu Championship medalists
World No-Gi Brazilian Jiu-Jitsu Championship medalists